The Renaissance was a European cultural movement spanning the 14th to the 17th century.

Renaissance may also refer to:

Cultural movements
 Dinosaur renaissance, renewed academic and popular interest in dinosaurs from the late 1960s
 Neo-Renaissance, a group of 19th century architectural revival styles
 Nuclear renaissance, a possible nuclear power industry revival

In Africa
 African Renaissance, the concept that African people and nations shall achieve cultural, scientific, and economic renewal
 Arab Renaissance, a cultural renaissance from the late 19th century in Egypt and the Arabic world
 Ethiopian Renaissance, sociopolitical movement and national myth espousing positive attitude for traditions and history of Ethiopia

In the Americas
 American Renaissance (disambiguation), several meanings
 Chicago Black Renaissance, a creative movement in the 1930s and 1940s
 Disney Renaissance, series of film releases from 1989-1999 by Walt Disney Animation Studios that saw the company achieve renewed critical and commercial success
 Harlem Renaissance, an intellectual, social, and artistic explosion in 1920s New York City
 Hawaiian Renaissance, a resurgence of distinct cultural identity
 Native American Renaissance, an increase in literary works by Native Americans from the 1960s
 San Francisco Renaissance, a range of poetic activity
 Southern Renaissance (United States), the reinvigoration of American Southern literature in the 1920s and 1930s

In Asia and Oceania
 Bengali Renaissance, a cultural, social, intellectual and artistic movement during the British Indian Empire
 Islamic Renaissance, a revival of the Islamic religion (not to be confused with Islamic Golden Age)
 Persian Renaissance, a period in history which saw the rise of various native Iranian Muslim dynasties in the Iranian Plateau after the 7th-century Muslim conquest of Iran and the fall of Sasanian Empire.
 Māori renaissance, a late-20th-century revival in New Zealand
 Sumerian Renaissance, outdated term for a perceived renaissance of Sumerian literature during the Ur III period
 Timurid Renaissance, religious, scientific, and artistic historical period from 14th to 16th century

In Europe
 High Renaissance, a short period of exceptional artistic production in the Italian states around 1500
 Italian Renaissance, a period from the 14th to 17th centuries
 Macedonian Renaissance, the period of the Macedonian dynasty of the Byzantine Empire (867–1056)
 Medical Renaissance, a period of progress in European medical knowledge from 1400 to 1700
 The three medieval renaissances
 Carolingian Renaissance, a period of cultural activity in the Carolingian Empire
 Ottonian Renaissance, a renaissance of Byzantine and Late Antique art in Europe in the Ottonian dynasty (936–1002)
 Renaissance of the 12th century, a period of change at the outset of the high Middle Ages
 Portuguese Renaissance, a cultural and artistic movement in Portugal during the 15th and 16th centuries
 Provençal Renaissance (or ), a literary and cultural association in France
 Roman Renaissance, from the mid-15th to the mid-16th centuries
 Scottish Renaissance, a mainly literary movement of the early to mid-20th century
 Sculpture in the Renaissance period, history of sculpture along the Renaissance period
 Urban renaissance (UK), a recent period of repopulation and regeneration of many British cities
 Yiddish Renaissance, a cultural and linguistic movement among Eastern European Jews in the late 19th century

Political movements and parties
 Andean Renaissance, a political party in Peru
 Ba'ath Party, a political party founded in Syria
 Croatian True Renaissance, a right-wing political party in Croatia
 Ennahda of Tunisia
 Islamic Renaissance Movement, a moderate Islamist political party of Algeria
 Islamic Renaissance Party of Tajikistan, a banned Islamist political party in Tajikistan
 National Renaissance Party (United States), an American neo-fascist group
 National Renaissance Party (Dominican Republic), a political party
 Renaissance (French political party), Emmanuel Macron's party
 Renaissance (Italian political party), a liberal political party in Italy
 Renaissance (Monegasque political party), a political party in Monaco

Music
Renaissance music, relating to the European cultural movement
Renaissance (band), an English progressive rock band
 Renaissance (club), a British electronic dance music club brand and record label
 Renaissance Recordings, a British record label

Albums
 Renaissance (The Association album), 1966
 Renaissance (Beyoncé album), 2022
 Renaissance (Diablo album), 2002
 Renaissance (E.Town Concrete album), 2003
 Renaissance (Lionel Richie album), 2000
 Renaissance (Marcus Miller album), 2012
 Renaissance (Mickey Finn's T. Rex album), 2002
 Renaissance (The Miracles album), 1973
 The Renaissance (Q-Tip album), 2008
 Renaissance (Renaissance album), 1969
 Renaissance (Soweto String Quartet album), 1996
The Renaissance (Super Junior album), 2021
 Renaissance (The Underachievers album), 2017
 Renaissance (Vanilla Fudge album), 1968
 Renaissance (Village People album), 1981
 Renaissance: The Mix Collection, a 1994 album by Sasha & John Digweed
 Renaissance, a 1992 album by Allen Eager
 The Renaissance EP, a 2001 EP by MxPx

Songs
 "Renaissance" (song), a 1994 song by M People on the album Elegant Slumming
 "La Renaissance", the national anthem of the Central African Republic

Film, television and theatre
 Renaissance (1964 film), a French animated short directed by Walerian Borowczyk
 Renaissance (2006 film), an animated tech noir science fiction film
 Renaissance (TV show), a fictional show in the British television series Moving Wallpaper
 Renaissance Broadcasting, an American television broadcasting company
 Renaissance Pictures, a film production company
 Renaissance Theatre Company, a theatre production company
 Renaissance Theatre (Mansfield, Ohio), a movie theater

Books and publications
 Renaissance (novel), a 1951 science fiction novel by Raymond F. Jones
 Renaissance Books, a bookstore in Milwaukee, Wisconsin
 Renaissance Magazine, a publication about renaissance fairs

Academics
 Renaissance 2010, a charter school program
 Renaissance Academy (Baltimore), a public charter school in Baltimore
 Renaissance College, Hong Kong, a private independent international school
 Renaissance High School, a school in Detroit, Michigan
 Renaissance High School (Idaho), a public school in Meridian, United States
 Renaissance Learning, an educational software company
 The Renaissance Society of America, an academic association

Architecture, buildings and developments
 Renaissance architecture, European architecture of the 14th to 16th centuries
 Renaissance Ballroom & Casino (originally Renaissance Theatre Building), a former venue in Harlem
 Renaissance Center, a group of skyscrapers in Michigan, United States
 Renaissance Centre (Erie, Pennsylvania), a 1928 skyscraper
 Renaissance, Lewisham, a mixed-use development in London
 Renaissance Tower (disambiguation), various buildings
 Chevron Renaissance, a mixed-use development in Queensland, Australia

Transport
 Renaissance Cruises, a Norwegian cruise ship operating company
 Renaissance (railcar), a fleet of passenger cars in Canada
 Renaissance Trains, a rail transport company
 For ships see List of ships named Renaissance

Other uses
 Renaissance (Bakalar), a 1989 public artwork by American artist David Bakalar
 Renaissance (demogroup), creators of the Zone 66 video game
 Renaissance (Fabergé egg), an 1894 jewelled agate Easter egg
 Renaissance Capital (Russian company), an investment bank
 Renaissance Community, a commune in the northeast United States
 Renaissance fair, a type of historical reenactment
 Renaissance FC, a football club in N'Djamena, Chad
 Renaissance FC de Ngoumou, a football club in Ngoumou, Cameroon
 Renaissance, Georgia, a rejected name for the city of South Fulton
 Renaissance Hotels, a hotel brand
 Renaissance (restaurant), a Los Angeles restaurant
 Renaissance Society, an art museum
 Renaissance Technologies, a hedge fund management company
 GNUstep Renaissance, a GNU development framework
 Ultima Online: Renaissance, a 2000 computer game expansion
 Renaissance Fusion, a startup developing a nuclear fusion reactor

See also 
 Renaissance Capital (disambiguation)
 Renaissance Charter School (disambiguation)
 Renaissance fair (disambiguation)
 Renaissance Island (disambiguation)
 Renaissance Man (disambiguation)
 Renaissance theatre (disambiguation)
 La Renaissance (disambiguation)
 Renascence (disambiguation)
 Reconnaissance (disambiguation)